The Bell 505 Jet Ranger X (JRX) is an American/Canadian light helicopter developed and manufactured by Bell Helicopter. The Bell 505 was unveiled at the 2013 Paris Airshow in June 2013 as the Bell SLS (Short Light Single). The Bell 505 designation was officially announced in February 2014. Its first flight occurred on November 11, 2014. The helicopter was certified by Transport Canada in December 2016.

Design and development

The helicopter was unveiled at the 2013 Paris Airshow on June 17, 2013 as the Bell SLS (Short Light Single). The model designation was later announced at HAI Heli-Expo 2014 in Anaheim, California on February 25, 2014.

The Bell 505 is a "clean sheet" design, but uses some dynamic components, such as the rotor system, of the Bell 206L-4. The airframe is constructed of metal and composites, and has a 22-square-foot (2.04 m²) flat floor and an 18-cubic-foot (0.51 m³) luggage bay. The Safran Arrius 2R is used with a dual-channel FADEC and a 3,000-hour Time-between-overhaul. The 505 cockpit is equipped with the Garmin G1000H glass avionics suite. Various options such as a cargo hook are available.

Main production started in 2016 in an 82,300-square-foot (7,646 m²), $26.3 million hangar facility at Lafayette Regional Airport in Louisiana, but the tooling was created for assembly in different places in the world. Louisiana offered $8 million in support for 250 new jobs, and started construction of the factory in August 2014 which was then leased to Bell. The factory opened in August 2015.

On May 19, 2016, Bell Helicopter CEO Mitch Snyder announced changes to the production supply chain that included relocating the Bell 505 production to Bell Helicopter's assembly and distribution center in Mirabel, Quebec, Canada. The Lafayette Assembly Center, which was specifically designed to manufacture and deliver the 505, will instead complete Bell 525 sub-assemblies and perform work on Northrop Grumman MQ-8C Fire Scout UAVs.

Initial assembly, flight testing and certification started in Canada while the factory was being built in the US. First flight went to 60 knots on November 11, 2014, and the second test aircraft flew in February 2015. Bell said they had 240 letters of intent (LOI) (50 from Europe) for the 505 in October 2014, and in November Chinese tourism operator Reignwood increased their LOI from 10 to 60 of the type. In August 2015, Bell had 350 letters of intent.

Certification by Transport Canada was awarded on December 21, 2016.

The first customer aircraft was delivered on March 7, 2017 to a private operator in Arizona, United States.

The 505 was certified by the Federal Aviation Administration in June 2017 and received high altitude certification (22,500 feet density altitude) in June 2019. Bell delivered the 100th 505 Jet Ranger X in June 2018, and the 200th in August 2019.

On Feb 21, 2023 Bell 505 became the first single-engine helicopter to perform a flight fueled by 100 percent sustainable aviation fuel.

Operators
Bahrain Air Force - received three Bell 505s in February 2023.

Indonesian Navy - received two Bell 505s in December 2021.

Jamaica Defence Force - ordered six Bell 505s in February 2021 for support of public safety operations and training.

Japan Coast Guard - received four Bell 505s in April 2018.

Montenegrin Air Force - received first of two Bell 505s in September 2020, and second in March 2021.

Alameda County Sheriff's Office
Fort Worth Police Department
Sacramento Police Department
Stockton Police Department
Los Angeles Fire Department
Florida Fish and Wildlife conservation commission

Vietnam Helicopter Corporation received two Bell 505s in May 13, 2019

Specifications

See also

References

External links

 
 
 

505 Jet Ranger X
2010s Canadian civil utility aircraft
2010s Canadian helicopters
Single-turbine helicopters
Aircraft first flown in 2014